Bactrianoscythris is a genus of gelechioid moths, which is mostly placed in the flower moth family, which is sometimes included as a subfamily in the Xyloryctidae, or together with these merged into the Oecophoridae.

Species
 Bactrianoscythris afghana Passerin d'Entrèves & Roggero, 2009
 Bactrianoscythris annae Passerin d'Entrèves & Roggero, 2009
 Bactrianoscythris drepanella Passerin d'Entrèves & Roggero, 2009
 Bactrianoscythris ginevrae Passerin d'Entrèves & Roggero, 2009
 Bactrianoscythris khinjani Passerin d'Entrèves & Roggero, 2009
 Bactrianoscythris lorella Bengtsson, 2014
 Bactrianoscythris pamirica (Passerin d'Entrèves & Roggero, 2008)
 Bactrianoscythris satyrella (Staudinger, 1880)

References

 
Moth genera